Thomas Fink (born 1954) is a poet and literary critic. He is the author of eleven books of poetry, two books of criticism, and a literature anthology, and he has co-edited two critical anthologies. He was featured in the 2007 edition of Scribner’s The Best American Poetry. Fink is a professor of English at City University of New York—LaGuardia.

Works

Books of Poetry
A Pageant for Every Addiction. Marsh Hawk Press. 2020
Hedge Fund Certainty Meritage Press and I. e. Press. 2019.
Selected Poems & Poetic Series. Marsh Hawk Press. 2016.
Joyride. Marsh Hawk Press. 2013.

No Appointment Necessary. Moria Poetry. 2006.

Books of Criticism and Edited Books
Reading the Difficulties: Dialogues with Contemporary American Innovative Poetry. University of Alabama Press. 2014.

Further reading

James Roderick Burns.  Review of No Appointment Necessary. Book/Mark (Winter 2008): 5-6. Print.
Patricia Carlin. “Patricia Carlin Presents a Poem by Thomas Fink.” Best American Poetry Blog. 15 Nov. 2009. Web.
Barry Dordick. “After Taxes by Thomas Fink.” Galatea Resurrects 1 (Mar. 2006) Web.
Freedman, Lewis. “This Collision of Multiplicity and Singularity: A Review of Thomas Fink’s ‘Yinglish Strophes 1-19.” Jacket 2 (2012). Web.
Noah Eli Gordon. Review of After Taxes. Xantippe 3 (2005): 109-114. Print.
Judith Halden-Sullivan. “(Im)possible Surprises: On Fink’s Surprise Visit.” Minnesota Review. 43-44 (1995): 276-80. Print.
M.D.H. Johnson. “After Taxes.” Book/Mark (Winter 2005): 6-7. Print.
Steven Karl. Review of Clarity and Other Poems. Galatea Resurrects 12 (May 2009) Web.
Kimmelman, Burt. "Let 'em eat kitsch: A Review of Thomas Fink's 'Joyride.'" Jacket 2 (2014). Web.
Louis McKee. “Number Forty-Eight.” American Book Review 26.6 (September/October 2005): 25, 31. Print.
Stephen Paul Miller. “Periodizing Ashbery and His Influence.” The Tribe of John: Ashbery and Contemporary Poetry. Ed. Susan M. Schultz. *Tuscaloosa: University of Alabama Press, 1995: 146-7. Print.
Daniel Morris. Review of Gossip. Confrontation. 82/83 (Spring/Summer 2003): 327-9. Print.
Susan Smith Nash. “On Thomas Fink’s Peace Conference.” Press 1. 5.3 (Jan.-Apr. 2012). Web.
Tim Peterson. Review of No Appointment Necessary. Galatea Resurrects 6 (May 2007) Web.
Shivaji Sengupta. “Absence, Presence, and Meaning: Thomas Fink’s After Taxes.” Jacket 26 (Oct. 2004) Web.
Carole Stone. “Review of Thomas Fink’s After Taxes.” Moria Poetry Journal. 7.3 & 4(Winter/Spring 2005) Web.

References

1954 births
Living people
American male poets
Princeton University alumni
20th-century American poets
21st-century American poets
Place of birth missing (living people)
20th-century American male writers
21st-century American male writers